Emil Nikolaisen (born 4 February 1977 in Moi, Norway) is a musician and producer from Norway. He is frontman, bandleader, songwriter, guitarist & singer of the well-known Norwegian alternative rock band Serena-Maneesh.

Nikolaisen has previously appeared as drummer in Norwegian punk rock band Silver also drumming in pop group The Loch Ness Mouse, as well as a guitarist and songwriter in the indie band Royal, He also has a past as guitarist in the metal band Extol and produced albums for Årabrot, Carmen Villain, Okkultokrati, Elvira Nikolaisen and Maria Solheim among others, as well as having contributed on numerous records by artists like Wovenhand, A Place To Bury Strangers, Brian Jonestown Massacre and Todd Rundgren/Lindstrøm.

References

1977 births
Living people
People from Lund, Norway
Norwegian black metal musicians
Norwegian heavy metal guitarists
Norwegian multi-instrumentalists
Norwegian record producers
Norwegian rock guitarists
Norwegian rock singers
Norwegian singer-songwriters
Punk rock drummers
21st-century Norwegian singers
21st-century Norwegian guitarists
21st-century drummers
21st-century Norwegian male singers
Extol members